St Etheldreda's is the Anglican  parish church of Old Hatfield, Hertfordshire in the United Kingdom.  Parts of the building are 13th century and there is evidence there was a church here before this in Saxon times. It is situated in the old village of Hatfield just east of  the modern town of Hatfield and close to  the walls of Hatfield House, once a royal palace. It once also served Hatfield House as a place of worship as well as the village and so is exceptionally grand for a parish church. The dedication to St Etheldreda derives from the Bishops of Ely for whom she is a patron saint and who once occupied the House when it was a bishops' palace.

Description 
The church stands at the top of a hill with Old Hatfield village centre to the west. The building material is largely flint. It is cruciform with a tower at the western end. Most construction was between the 13th and 15th centuries.

Two chapels have been added on either side of the chancel;  on the north side is  the Salisbury Chapel and on the south side the Brocket Chapel. The Salisbury Chapel is the traditional burial place of the Cecil family and contains the ornate tomb of Robert Cecil, the first Earl of Salisbury. Two British Prime Ministers, Lord Melbourne and Lord Salisbury (both the first and last Prime Ministers of Queen Victoria's reign), are also interred here. Some rebuilding, particularly of the window tracery, was done during the Victorian era.

Historically, St Etheldreda's Church had a steeple on top of the west tower and this is shown in many early illustrations. It was last re-erected in 1847 to commemorate the visit to the town  of Queen Victoria and Prince Albert. However it  was removed in 1930.

There are eight bells in the tower which now form a Carillon, installed in 1786. It is set to play different tunes on each day of the week.

There are many memorials, the oldest being a knight in armour of about 1160.

References

External links

 Church plan and list of monuments  St. Etheldreda, Bishops Hatfield, Guide First Edition, 1939. Published by the British Publishing Co. Ltd., Gloucester. Accessed May 2016
 Church history at the church's website. Accessed May 2016, Archive December 2019.
 St Etheldreda Hatfield Parish Church From Topographical Dictionary of England, 1831. Accessed May 2016
St. EtheldredaHatfield Churches by Peter Massingham (2009)   Accessed May 2016 
 St. Etheldreda's  'Parishes: Hatfield', in A History of the County of Hertford: Volume 3, ed. William Page (London, 1912), pp. 91–111. published at British History Online pp 91–111 Accessed May 2016

Hatfield, Hertfordshire
Hatfield